Underarm hair, also known as axillary hair, is the hair in the underarm area (axilla).

Development

Underarm or axillary hair goes through four stages of development, driven by weak androgens produced by the adrenal in males and females during adrenarche, and testosterone from the testicle in males during puberty.

The importance of human underarm hair is unclear. It may naturally wick sweat or other moisture away from the skin, aiding ventilation. Colonization by odor-producing bacteria is thereby transferred away from the skin (see skin flora).

Function

Reducing friction 
Armpit hair prevents skin-to-skin contact during activities that involve arm motion, such as running and walking. The same applies to pubic hair.

Spreading pheromones
The armpits release odor-containing pheromones, a naturally produced chemical that plays an important role in sexual attraction. Armpit hair traps odor, making the pheromones even stronger. A study in 2018 including 96 heterosexual couples found that there were stress-relieving benefits to smelling a romantic partner’s natural scent.

Impact of hair removal

Effect on odor
А 2012 study on the impact of hair removal on odor found that shaved armpits were rated the same as unshaved armpits.

Chemical absorption 
A 2017 study on chemical absorption from deodorants as a result of hair removal showed an increase in chemical absorption from .01% to .06% where skin has been damaged by recent shaving.

A 2003 study on aluminum antiperspirant usage and the age of breast cancer onset tentatively concluded that “underarm shaving with antiperspirant/deodorant use may play a role in breast cancer.”

See also 
Adrenal gland
Adrenarche
Ferriman–Gallwey score
Hirsutism
History of removal of leg and underarm hair in the United States
Puberty
Tanner staging

References

External links 
 

Upper limb anatomy
Human hair